Pedro Rafael Pierluisi Urrutia (born April 26, 1959) is a Puerto Rican politician and lawyer currently serving as governor of Puerto Rico. He has previously served as Secretary of Justice, Resident Commissioner, acting 
Secretary of State, interim governor of Puerto Rico and as private attorney for Puerto Rico's fiscal oversight board under the Puerto Rico Oversight, Management, and Economic Stability Act.

Early life and education 
Pierluisi was born on April 26, 1959, in San Juan, Puerto Rico. His parents are Jorge Pierluisi Díaz and Doris Urrutia. He attended Colegio Marista Guaynabo in Guaynabo, graduating in 1977. In 1981, he received a Bachelor of Arts degree in American History from Tulane University, and later earned a Juris Doctor degree from George Washington University Law School in 1984. He was President of the Puerto Rico Statehood Students Association chapter at Tulane University.  During his studies at George Washington University, Pierluisi interned at the congressional office of then-Resident Commissioner of Puerto Rico Baltasar Corrada del Río.

Early political career 
He practiced law in Puerto Rico from 1990 until 1993. In 1993, Governor Pedro Rossello nominated Pierluisi to serve as Puerto Rico's Secretary of Justice. His nomination was unanimously confirmed by the Puerto Rican legislature.

U.S. House of Representatives 

On May 18, 2007, Pierluisi announced his candidacy for Resident Commissioner, Puerto Rico's sole delegate to the United States Congress in the November 2008 elections. He accompanied then current Resident Commissioner and gubernatorial candidate Luis Fortuño  in the March 9, 2008 NPP primary ticket.

Pierluisi is a member of the New Progressive Party in Puerto Rico which advocates statehood for the Island territory. While on Capitol Hill, Pierluisi caucused with the House Democratic Caucus.

As Resident Commissioner, Pierluisi introduced H.R. 2499, which sought to provide for a plebiscite to be held in Puerto Rico to determine the island's ultimate political status. The bill was passed by the House of Representatives but did not receive a vote in the Senate, and lapsed following the sine die adjournment of the 111th Congress. In a separate bill, H.R. 870, Pierluisi sought to add Puerto Rico to Chapter 9 of the U.S. Bankruptcy Code so that the island's government-owned corporations could file for bankruptcy — a privilege they do not enjoy due to the territory's exclusion from the code.

On May 15, 2013, Pierluisi filed H.R. 2000, a bill to admit Puerto Rico as a state.

Rosselló succession 

In late July 2019 the embattled governor, Ricardo Rosselló, nominated Pierluisi to serve as Secretary of State of Puerto Rico. He was additionally sworn into the role as a recess appointment. Rosselló then summoned Puerto Rico's Legislative Assembly for them to issue their advice and consent. The House of Representatives approved his nomination 26–21. However, the following day, members of the Puerto Rican Senate announced that action on his nomination would not occur until August 1. When Rosselló resigned on August 2, he declared Pierluisi to be governor although he had not been confirmed by both the House and the Senate as secretary of state, and Pierluisi affirmed Rosselló's declaration. Pierluisi's accession to the governorship was challenged in the courts as being unconstitutional. On August 5, the Puerto Rico Senate filed a lawsuit against his appointment as governor by contending that unless he obtained the Senate's assent, his governorship was unconstitutional. Two days later, the Puerto Rico Supreme Court ruled that the law that enabled his swearing in was unconstitutional and ordered that the succession take place per Law 7 of 1952, as opposed to Law 7 of 2005.

2020 elections 

On August 16, 2020, Pierluisi won the PNP gubernatorial primary race against governor Wanda Vázquez Garced. With 75.6% of voting stations reporting, Pierluisi has won about 57.9% of the votes over Vazquez's 42.1%, clinching the nomination for New Progressive Party. On November 3, 2020, Pierluisi was elected as the Governor of Puerto Rico. He received approximately 32.9% of all the votes, distributed among 6 candidates that ran for office.

On Saturday, January 2, 2021, Pierluisi took the oath of office. At 8:00 a.m., there was a private ceremony in which he took the oath from the Chief Justice of the Supreme Court, Maite Oronoz Rodríguez. This was followed by a public ceremony on the northern side of the Capitol of Puerto Rico, where Pierluisi retook the oath of office publicly and gave his inaugural address.

In February 2023, Pedro Pierluisi pleaded before the Senate in Washington D.C. for the United States of America to approve the bill which provides for an electoral consultation in Puerto Rico between the options of American statehood, independence or of independence in free association with the United States of America..

Personal life 
Governor Pierluisi is the father of four adult children and the grandfather of five grandchildren.

His first marriage was to María Eugenia Rojo, with whom he shares his four children. They divorced in the late 1990s. In 2019, after twelve years of marriage, he and his ex-wife María Elena Carrión divorced. The Governor is currently single. Pierluisi's father, Jorge Pierluisi, served as Secretary of Puerto Rico's Housing Department under Gov. Carlos Romero Barceló from 1977 to 1985. His brother, José Jaime Pierluisi, an economic adviser to then governor Pedro Rossello, was shot and killed during a carjacking in 1994.

Honors 
 : Grand Cross of the Order of Isabella the Catholic

See also 
 List of Hispanic Americans in the United States Congress

Notes

References

External links 

 
 Congressman Pedro Pierluisi official U.S. House website
 Pedro Pierluisi for Congress (Spanish) official campaign website
 

|-

|-

|-

|-

|-

|-

|-

 

 

1959 births
Democratic Party (Puerto Rico) politicians
Democratic Party members of the United States House of Representatives from Puerto Rico
Democratic Party governors of Puerto Rico
George Washington University Law School alumni
Governors of Puerto Rico
Living people
New Progressive Party (Puerto Rico) politicians
Presidents of the New Progressive Party (Puerto Rico)
Puerto Rican lawyers
Puerto Rican party leaders
Puerto Rican Roman Catholics
Statehood movement in Puerto Rico
Puerto Rico Statehood Students Association alumni
Resident Commissioners of Puerto Rico
Secretaries of Justice of Puerto Rico
Secretaries of State of Puerto Rico
Tulane University alumni
21st-century Puerto Rican politicians
20th-century Puerto Rican politicians
Puerto Rican people of Corsican descent